is a Japanese voice actor. His major roles include Arlong in One Piece, Asuma Sarutobi in Naruto, Akio Ohtori in Revolutionary Girl Utena, Isamu Kenmochi in Kindaichi Case Files, Big Zenki in Zenki, and Jotaro Kujo in JoJo's Bizarre Adventure (OVA).  In video games, he provides the voice of Nobunaga Oda in the Samurai Warriors and Warriors Orochi series. He also provides the Japanese voice for Billy Blanks, David Duchovny, Tony Leung Chiu-wai and Luke Perry. He was also the first dub-over artist of Daniel Craig and Andy Lau in their early days.

Filmography

Anime

Film

Drama CDs

Tokusatsu

Video games

Overseas dubbing

References

External links
  
 Official agency profile 
 

1957 births
Living people
Japanese male video game actors
Japanese male voice actors
Male voice actors from Yokohama
20th-century Japanese male actors
21st-century Japanese male actors